Judy Nylon is a widely influential multidisciplinary American artist who moved to London in 1970. She was half of the punk rock music group Snatch, which also featured fellow American expat Patti Palladin (who was later in The Flying Lizards). Rock music aficionados living in New York City and London during the era spanning glam, punk and no wave are likely to appreciate her influence, the bulk of which has not been preserved in print nor on vinyl or CD. NMEs Paul Tickell proclaimed her LP Pal Judy (1982), coproduced by Nylon and Adrian Sherwood, "a classic rainy day bit of sound and song to drift away to."

Nylon is the orderly, ergonomic Judy of Brian Eno's song "Back in Judy's Jungle", on his 1974 LP Taking Tiger Mountain (By Strategy). Moreover, in his legendary account of how the genesis of ambient music came about, which first appeared on the back cover of his 1975 LP Discreet Music, Eno anecdotally credits Nylon. Concomitantly during the '70s she often collaborated with Welsh musician/producer John Cale. In 1974 she sang the song "The Man Who Couldn't Afford to Orgy" on his album Fear. She subsequently performed with him at concerts and on other recordings, including his 1987 live album Even Cowgirls Get the Blues.

"R.A.F." (b/w "Kings Lead Hat"), a 1978 Eno song by Snatch and Eno (Polydor Records) that involves sound elements from a Baader Meinhof ransom message made by public telephone at the time of the Lufthansa Flight 181 hijacking, provides insight into Nylon's innovative sound montage/cut-up practice—as does the 1983 Snatch roundup LP Witch I, aided by Jon Savage's liner notes. Along with Patti Palladin she also sang backing vocals with Johnny Thunders' All Stars on his early 1978 shows, which also featured members of The Only Ones.

Nylon's current multi-disciplinary work focuses on international co-authorship and decentralized many-to-many style video storytelling. Since 2007 she has periodically contributed to the collective Aether9, who collaborate on multinational multi-streamed networked performances intending to develop low-cost, open-source, nomadic public art production.

In 2010, Nylon contributed guest vocals to the Babylon By Car album by the French electronica group Bot'Ox.

Other information
Nylon appears in Eno's 1974 promotional video for his song "China My China", from Taking Tiger Mountain (By Strategy).

References

External links
, Jan. 16, 2016.
, Feb. 13, 2016.
Judy Nylon Collection on New York City Tenants' Rights, Fales Library and Special Collections at New York University

No wave musicians
American expatriates in the United Kingdom
American punk rock musicians
Brian Eno
1948 births
Living people
Women in punk